The Matrinxã River is a river of Goiás state in central Brazil.

See also
List of rivers of Goiás

References

Rivers of Goiás